Dawadmi Airport, also known as Dawadmi Domestic Airport, is an airport serving Dawadmi, a city in the Riyadh province in Saudi Arabia. The airport was established in 2003.

The airport has a single runway in roughly NNW to SSE direction. In April 2003, the new airport in the city was inaugurated by the Crown Prince of Saudi Arabia.

Facilities

Airlines and destinations

Airlines offering scheduled passenger service:

See also 

 Saudia
 List of airports in Saudi Arabia
 Riyadh Province

References

External links

 
 
 

2003 establishments in Saudi Arabia
Airports established in 2003
Airports in Saudi Arabia
Riyadh Province